Ali Shabanau (born 25 August 1989 in Dagestan), also known as Ali Shabanov, is a Russian-born Avar freestyle wrestler who represents Belarus that competed at the 2012 Olympics at 66 kg.

2012 Olympics
Shabanau won his first match (round of 16) against Jared Frayer of the United States.  Shabanau lost his next match (quarterfinal) to Jabrayil Hasanov of Azerbaijan.  Shabanau's final placement at the 2012 Olympics was 10th place.

References

External links
 

1989 births
Living people
People from Kizilyurt
Wrestlers at the 2012 Summer Olympics
Belarusian male sport wrestlers
Olympic wrestlers of Belarus
Wrestlers at the 2015 European Games
World Wrestling Championships medalists
Wrestlers at the 2019 European Games
European Games medalists in wrestling
European Games bronze medalists for Belarus
European Wrestling Championships medalists
Wrestlers at the 2020 Summer Olympics